In the contemporary English language, the noun Polack ( and ) is a derogatory, mainly North American, reference to a person of Polish descent or from Poland. It is an anglicisation of the Polish masculine noun Polak, which denotes a person of Polish ethnicity and typically male gender. However, the English loanword is considered an ethnic slur.

History 
According to Online Etymology Dictionary by Douglas Harper, Polack meant as "Polish immigrant, person of Polish descent" was used in American English until the late 19th century (1879) to describe a "Polish person" in a non-offensive way (1574). Dictionary.com Unabridged (v 1.1) based on the Unabridged Dictionary by Random House claims that the word originated between 1590 and 1600. For example, Shakespeare uses the term Polacks in his tragedy Hamlet to refer to opponents of Hamlet's father. A quote is given below:

In an Irish-published edition of Hamlet by the Educational Company, Patrick Murray noted: "Some editors, however, argue that Polacks should read as pole-axe, and that Horatio is remembering an angry Old Hamlet striking the ice with his battle-axe".

On 26 July 2008, The Times featured a comment piece by restaurant reviewer and columnist Giles Coren (known for his profanity-strewn complaints), which contained viewpoints that many Poles considered to be anti-Polish. In a piece, entitled "Two waves of immigration, Poles apart", Coren used the ethnic slur Polack to describe Polish immigrants who can "clear off", in reference to Polish immigrants leaving the United Kingdom in response to low-paying construction jobs drying up. He went on to articulate his views about the role of Poles in the Holocaust in occupied Poland, referencing the fact that his great-grandfather had left Poland for the United Kingdom:

The piece prompted a letter of complaint to The Times from the Polish ambassador to the UK, Barbara Tuge-Erecińska. She wrote that "the issue of Polish–Jewish relations has been unfairly and deeply falsified" by his "aggressive remarks" and "contempt". Coren's comments caused the Federation of Poles in Great Britain to attempt to demand a published apology from The Times under threat of an official complaint to the Press Complaints Commission, which has the power to force an official apology. After the Press Complaints Commission rejected their complaint because the criticism had been of a group rather than an individual, the Federation of Poles in Great Britain lodged a complaint with the European Court of Human Rights.

Ethnonyms 
The neutral English language noun for a Polish person (male or female) today is Pole (see also: Naming Poland in foreign languages). In some other languages such as Swedish, Norwegian or Scots, polack or polakk are inoffensive terms for a person from Poland.

In Iberian languages, polaco is a mild slur for people from Catalonia, though it is a completely neutral way of referring to Polish people in all Ibero-American countries except Brazil, where, much like galego (Galician), alemão (German) and russo (Russian), it became a politically incorrect term, and the noun used for Polish people is polonês (such term is absent from Spanish and other Portuguese variants).

In Ukrainian, the old exonym лях (lyakh, lyakhy) is now considered offensive In Russian the same word, formerly often used with negative connotations but not generally offensive, is obsolete. In both languages it was replaced by the neutral  (polyak).

See also 
 Anti-Polish sentiment
 Polish joke, at times referred to as "Polack joke"

References 

Anti-Polish sentiment
Stereotypes of Polish people
Pejorative terms for white people
English words
Pejorative terms for European people